Bollinger is a habitational surname for someone from any of three places called Bollingen, in Schwyz, Württemberg, and Oldenburg. Notable people with the surname include:

Albert Bollinger (1870–1933), American lawyer, businessman, and politician
Brian Bollinger (born 1968), American football player
Brooks Bollinger  (born 1979),  American football player
Donald G. Bollinger (1915–2000), American shipbuilder and politician
Doug Bollinger (born 1981), Australian cricketer
John Bollinger, American financial analyst
John Bollinger, a baby who was refused treatment by Doctor Harry J. Haiselden
Lee Bollinger, American university president
Lily Bollinger, ran the Bollinger champagne house from 1941 to 1971
George Frederick Bollinger  (1770–1842), American settler
Otto Bollinger  (1843–1909), German pathologist
Terry Bollinger (born 1955), American writer

German toponymic surnames